The 1926 Brooklyn Lions season was their first and only season in the league. The team finished 3–8, placing fourteenth in the league.

Schedule

Standings

References

Brooklyn Lions seasons
Brooklyn Lions
Brooklyn Lions
1920s in Brooklyn
Flatbush, Brooklyn